Billy Graham's crusades were evangelistic campaigns conducted by Billy Graham between 1947 and 2005. Billy Graham conducted 417 crusades in 185 countries and territories on six continents. The first Billy Graham evangelistic campaign, held September 13–21, 1947, in the Civic Auditorium in Grand Rapids, Michigan, was attended by 6,000 people. He would rent a large venue, such as a stadium, park, or street. As the sessions became larger, he arranged a group of up to 5,000 people to sing in a choir. He would preach the gospel and invite people to come forward to ask Jesus to be their savior and pray together. The inquirers were often given a copy of the Gospel of John or a Bible study booklet. In Durban, South Africa, in 1973, the crowd of some 100,000 was the first large mixed-race event in apartheid South Africa. In Moscow, in 1992, one-quarter of the 155,000 people in Graham's audience went forward at his call. During his crusades, he has frequently used the altar call song, "Just As I Am". Many musical artists would accompany Graham on his crusades to sing either hymns or reflective songs including Cliff Barrows, Cliff Richard, Shelia Walsh, George Beverley Shea and George Hamilton IV.

Over 58 years, Billy Graham reached more than 210 million people (face to face and by satellite feeds) in over 185 countries and territories on six continents. The longest Graham's evangelistic crusade took place in New York City in Madison Square Garden in 1957, which lasted 16 weeks. The largest audience in the history of Graham's ministry assembled at Yoido Plaza in Seoul in South Korea in 1973 (1.1 million people).

Graham's revival meetings were most commonly called "crusades", and were billed as such for decades, but Graham himself began calling them "missions" after the September 11 attacks due to a potentially offensive connotation of the word crusade among Muslims.

Chronological list

See also 
 Billy Graham Evangelistic Association

References

External links 
 
 
 
 
 Billy Graham sermons Billy Graham Center
 
 

Billy Graham
Graham, Billy